AD Andromedae (AD And) is an eclipsing binary in the constellation Andromeda. Its maximum apparent visual magnitude is 11.2, but it shows a decrease of 0.62 magnitudes during the main eclipse and 0.58 during the secondary one. It is classified as a Beta Lyrae variable star with a period of almost one day.

System
The AD Andromedae system consists of two close main sequence stars of spectral type A0V. They orbit so close to each other that they have an ellipsoidal shape induced by their gravitational interaction.

The presence in this system of a third body with a minimum mass of 2.21  has been proposed; however, it should give a significant contribution to the light emitted by the system, and has not been detected yet. A possible solution is for two unseen, but less massive and luminous, stars orbiting close to each other.

Variability
The orbital plane of the two stars is aligned to our line of sight, so each component eclipses the other when passing in front of it. In AD Andromedae this cycle repeats with a period 20 minutes less than one day.

A cyclic variation of 14.3 years in the orbital period of this binary system has been reported, and this could be an effect of another body orbiting in this system.

References

Andromeda (constellation)
Andromedae, AD
J23364500+4840155
Beta Lyrae variables
BD+47 4207
A-type main-sequence stars